André Ghem and Tristan Lamasine were the defending champions but chose not to defend their title.

David Pérez Sanz and Max Schnur won the title after defeating Steven de Waard and Andreas Mies in the final, 6–4, 6–4.

Seeds

Draw

References
 Main Draw

Tampere Open - Doubles
2016 Men's Doubles